Kopetdag District is a borough of Aşgabat in Turkmenistan. As a borough, it is headed by a presidentially appointed mayor.  

Köpetdag District boundaries on OpenStreetMap

Etymology
The district is named after the Kopet Dag (viz.) mountain range visible to the south.

History
It is located in the historical center of Ashgabat. During the Soviet era, it was known by the names Stalin etraby and, after 1961, Proletar etraby, until it was renamed on 14 September 1993 by presidential decree to its present Köpetdag etraby.

According to the Soviet census of 1989, 149,996 people lived in the district.

In late 2021, the new State Tribune was opened on the outskirts of the district. In addition, the largest, at 120-meters, LED screen in Central Asia was installed near the tribune. It was opened with the intention of holding mass events on national holidays. The annual Turkmen Independence Day Parade in honor of the country's 30th anniversary was held on this square in September 2021.

Education
The Academy of the Ministry of National Security, the Turkmen State Border Service Institute, the Military Institute of the Ministry of Defense, and the Turkmen State Institute of Physical Education and Sports are located in the district.

Other places of interest
Turkmen Carpet Museum
World of Turkmenbashi Tales

See also
 Ashgabat
 Districts of Turkmenistan

References

See also
 Districts of Turkmenistan

Districts of Turkmenistan